The Alexandria Black History Museum, located at 902 Wythe St., Alexandria, Virginia, is operated by the City of Alexandria. The building was formerly the Robert Robinson Library, originally constructed in 1940 as the first "separate but equal" library for African Americans in the segregated city.

History 

In 1794, Alexandria Library opened as a private lending library, calling itself the Alexandria Library Company. In 1937, Dr. Robert South Barrett donated funds to build Alexandria's Public Library. The Library Company cooperated in this effort, contracting with the Alexandria City Council to turn over its collections to City of Alexandria as the City agreed to include the public library's operating expenses in its budget.

Since the library's budget was collected from the taxes paid by every American Citizen regardless their race, the lawyer Samuel Wilbert Tucker organized in 1939 a pacific sit-in at the new and "whites only" Alexandria, Virginia public library (Kate Waller Barret branch) that lead to their arrest by Virginia's police.

The 1939 event is commonly cited as the first non-violent protest by African Americans against racial segregation. The museum has changing exhibitions on local and national topics related to African Americans.

Museum 

The museum also operates the Alexandria African American Heritage Park, a  park at 500 Holland Lane, which contains a  nineteenth-century African-American cemetery that was buried under a city landfill in the 1960s.

See also
 Contrabands and Freedmen Cemetery
 Franklin and Armfield Office
 Frederick Douglass National Historic Site
 National Museum of African American History and Culture
 National Museum of African Art
 Anacostia Community Museum
 Founders Library
 Alexandria Library (Virginia)
 Jim Crow laws
 List of museums focused on African Americans

Further reading

External links
 Official Web site of the Alexandria Black History Museum

References

Museums in Alexandria, Virginia
African-American history of Virginia
Buildings and structures in Alexandria, Virginia
Cemeteries in Alexandria, Virginia
Tourist attractions in Alexandria, Virginia
African-American museums in Virginia
Parks in Alexandria, Virginia